Local elections were held in the Rizal on May 9, 2022, as part of the 2022 general elections. Voters selected candidates for all local positions: a municipal/city mayor, vice mayor and town councilors, as well as members of the Sangguniang Panlalawigan, the governor, vice-governor and representatives for the four districts of Rizal.

Background 
Governor Rebecca "Nini" Ynares was term-limited and illegible to run. Initially, her husband, Presidential Adviser for Southern Tagalog and former Governor Casimiro "Ito" Ynares Jr., was supposed to run, but was later substituted by their daughter, GSIS Board of Trustee Nina Ricci Ynares. Other candidates for governor were Andrew Sumulong, Jose Velasco, Benedict Angeles, and Fernando Dizon.

Vice Governor ran for third and final term. He faced other candidates Sonny Clemente, Patrick Ken Felix, and Ricky Juan Balauro.

Results

For Governor 
Nina Ricci Ynares won the elections.

For Vice Governor 
Vice Governor Reynaldo "Junrey" San Juan Jr. defeated his closest rivals, Sonny Clemente of PDDS and independent Patrick Ken Felix, with 207,735 and 160,763 votes respectively.

For Representative

First District 

Rep. Michael John "Jack" Duavit won unopposed.

Second District 

Board Member Emigdio Tanjuatco III won the election.

Third District 
Former Metropolitan Manila Development Authority General Manager Jose Arturo "Jojo" Garcia Jr. won against former San Mateo Mayor Cristina Diaz.

Fourth District 
Rep. Juan Fidel Felipe Nograles defeated his predecessor, former Rep. Isidro Rodriguez Jr.

Antipolo's First District 
Rep. Roberto "Robbie" Puno was re-elected.

Antipolo's Second District 
The seat was vacant upon the death of former representative Resureccion "Cion" Acop. Acop's husband former representative Romeo "Romy" Acop ran and won unopposed.

For Provincial Board Members 
All 4 Districts of Rizal and all 2 districts of Antipolo elected members of the Rizal Provincial Board.

First District 
Municipalities: Angono, Binangonan, Cainta, Taytay
All incumbents are running for re-election, except for former Vice Governor and Board Member Anthony Jesus "Jestoni" Alarcon who decided not to seek for another term despite being qualified to do so, hinting at returning to being a full-time actor instead. Angono municipal councilor Jo Anne Saguinsin ran in his place.

Second District 
Municipalities: Baras, Cardona, Jala-Jala, Morong, Pililla, Tanay, Teresa
On March 25, 2021, President Rodrigo Duterte signed the Republic Act 11533, "An Act Reappropriating the Second Legislative District of the Province of Rizal Into Three Legislative Districts". San Mateo and Rodriguez (Montalban) will become Third and Fourth District, respectively.

Board Member Emigidio Tanjuatco III ran for representative. Ricardo Bernados and Hector Robles of NPC won the elections.

Third District 
Municipality: San Mateo
On March 25, 2021, President Rodrigo Duterte signed the Republic Act 11533, " An Act Reappropriating the Second Legislative District of the Province of Rizal Into Three Legislative Districts". San Mateo and Rodriguez (Montalban) will become Third and Fourth District, respectively.

Board member Bartolome "Omie" Rivera Jr., who hailed from San Mateo, ran as mayor. His party's nominee was John Patrick Bautista. Board member Rolando Rivera, who also hailed from San Mateo, was term limited and passed away on March 24, 2022.

John Patrick Bautista won the elections.

Fourth District 
Municipality:  Rodriguez (Montalban)
On March 25, 2021, President Rodrigo Duterte signed the Republic Act 11533, "An Act Reappropriating the Second Legislative District of the Province of Rizal Into Three Legislative Districts". San Mateo and Rodriguez (Montalban) will become Third and Fourth District, respectively.

Board Member Rommel Ayuson, who hailed from Rodriguez won the elections.

Antipolo's First District 
Rep. Roberto Andres "Randy" Puno Jr., son of former Representatives Roberto Puno and Chiqui Roa-Puno won unopposed.

Antipolo's Second District 
Board Member Alexander "Bobot" Marquez sought comeback to city council. His party chosen former Mayor Danilo "Nilo" Leyble, ran and won a fresh first term unopposed.

City and Municipal Elections 
All municipalities and City of Antipolo in Rizal will elect mayor and vice-mayor this election. The candidates for mayor and vice mayor with the highest number of votes wins the seat; they are voted separately, therefore, they may be of different parties when elected. Below is the list of mayoralty and vice-mayoralty candidates of each city and municipalities per district.

First District

Angono
Mayor Jeri Mae Calderon won her second term unopposed.

Vice Mayor Gerry Calderon defeated former Councilor Januver Tiamson, son of former Mayor Saturnino Tiamson.

Binangonan
Mayor Cesar Ynares was re-elected for third and final term unopposed.

Vice Mayor Cecilio "Boyet" Ynares defeated Manuel Reyes Sr.

Cainta
Maria Elenita Nieto, wife of Mayor Johnielle Keith Nieto defeated Alvin Patrimonio.

Vice Mayor Ace Servillon defeated former Mayor Mon Ilagan.

Taytay

Allan Martine De Leon, brother of former Mayor Janet De Leon-Mercado, defeated Mayor George Ricardo "Joric" Gacula.

Municipal Councilor Sophia Priscilla "Pia" Cabral defeated Vice Mayor Michell "Mitch" Bermundo.

Second District

Baras
Vice Mayor and former Mayor Wilfredo "Willy" Robles won the elections.

Mayor and former Vice Mayor Kathrine "KC" Robles won the elections.

Cardona
Former Mayor Bernardo "Jun" San Juan Jr. defeated Mayor Teodulo "Totoy" Campo.

Vice Mayor Gil Pandac defeated Councilor Al Jerold "Deyong" San Jose.

Jala-Jala
Mayor Elmer Pillas defeated former Mayor Narciso "Narcing" Villaran for the second time.

Vice Mayor Jose "Jolet" Delos Santos died in March 31, 2020. He was replaced by First Councilor Harry Añago. Acting Vice Mayor Harry Añago won a fresh first term as Vice Mayor.

Morong
Sidney Soriano defeated his closest rivals Vice Mayor Julian De Ungria and former Vice Mayor Joseph Buenaventura

Jose Fred Feliciano Jr. defeated Councilor Harold Pascual.

Pililla
Mayor Dan Masinsin defeated former Mayor Leandro Masikip Sr.

Vice Mayor Rafael "Paeng" Carpio was defeated by Jaime Paz.

Tanay
Vice Mayor Rafael Tanjuatco successfully sought mayoral comeback.

Mayor Rex Manuel Tanjuatco successfully sought vice-mayoral comeback.

Teresa
Former Mayor Rodel Dela Cruz defeated Vice Mayor Jose Jeriel Villegas and Chairman Romualdo Coralde.

Former Councilor Freddie Bonifacio defeated Mayor Raul Palino and former Councilor Gilbert Bernardino.

Third District

San Mateo

Former Mayor and Vice mayor Jose Rafael Diaz was defeated by Board Member and former Vice Mayor Bartolome "Omie" Rivera.

Councilor Jaime "Jimmy" Roxas defeated Ariel Diaz.

Fourth District

Rodriguez (Montalban)
Karen Mae "Mayet" Hernandez, sister of Mayor Dennis Hernandez, was defeated by Ronnie Evangelista.

Councilor Edgardo "Umpek" Sison won the vice-mayoral race.

Antipolo 

Mayor Andrea Bautista-Ynares supposedly ran for mayor. Later, she dropped her candidacy and replaced by her husband, Former Governor and Mayor Casimiro "Jun" Ynares III. Ynares successfully sought mayoral comeback.

Vice Mayor Josefina "Pining" Gatlabayan was re-elected for third and final term.

References

External links
 https://comelec.gov.ph/php-tpls-attachments/2022NLE/TentativeListsofCandidates/R4A/RIZAL/PROVINCIAL.pdf

2022 Philippine local elections
Elections in Rizal
May 2022 events in the Philippines
2022 elections in Calabarzon